This article is a list of brand name soft drink products.  In some cases, the relevant article is the parent brand or brand family.

By company

Coca-Cola Company 

Ambasa
Ameyal
Appletiser
Aquarius
Barq's
Beat
Beverly (discontinued in 2009)
Coca-Cola
Caffeine Free Coca-Cola
Coca-Cola Black Cherry Vanilla
Coca-Cola BlāK
Coca-Cola C2
Coca-Cola Cherry
Coca-Cola Citra
Coca-Cola Clear
Coca-Cola Life
Coca-Cola Light
Coca-Cola Light Sango
Coca-Cola Orange
Coca-Cola Orange Vanilla
Coca-Cola Raspberry
Coca-Cola Vanilla
Coca-Cola with Lemon
Coca-Cola with Lime
Coca-Cola Zero
Diet Coke
Diet Coke Lime
Diet Coke Plus
Diet Coke with Citrus Zest
Diet Coke with Lemon
Diet Coke with Zesty Blood Orange
New Coke (discontinued in 2002)
Campa Cola
Dasani

Delaware Punch
Fanta
Fanta Citrus
 Fanta Exotic
 Fantasy
 Cream Soda
 Grape
 Orange
 Strawberry
 Tangerine
 Wild Cherry
 Wild Strawberry
Fresca
Frescolihi
Frescolita

Inca Kola
Diet Inca Kola
Leed (discontinued in 1984)
Lift
Lilt
Limca
Mello Yello
Moxie
Mr. Pibb
Pibb Xtra
Powerade
 Qoo
Sprite
Sprite Cranberry
Sprite Ice
Sprite Lemon+
Sprite Remix (discontinued in 2005)
Sprite Zero
Surge
Tab
Tab Clear
Tab Energy
 Thums Up
Vault (discontinued in 2011)
Vault Red Blitz (discontinued in 2011)

Pepsi Co 

AMP Energy
Duke's
Fayrouz
Gatorade
Mirinda
Mountain Dew
Caffeine Free Mountain Dew
Diet Mountain Dew
 KickStart
MDX
 Mountain Dew Baja Blast
Mountain Dew Code Red
 Mountain Dew Game Fuel (promotional)
 Mountain Dew ICE Cherry
 Mountain Dew ICE Lemon Lime
 Mountain Dew Live Wire
 Mountain Dew Pitch Black
 Mountain Dew Pitch Black II (discontinued)
 Mountain Dew Revolution (discontinued)
 Mountain Dew Sangrita
 Mountain Dew Super Nova (discontinued)
 Mountain Dew Voltage
 Mountain Dew White Out
Mug Root Beer
 Nature's Twist (regular and sugar free)
Pepsi
Crystal Pepsi
Diet Pepsi
Pepsi Cola
 Pepsi Fire
Pepsi Jazz Black Cherry & Vanilla
Pepsi Jazz Strawberries & Cream
Pepsi Lime
Pepsi Mango
Pepsi Max
Pepsi Perfect
Seaman's Beverages (Orange and Ginger Ale)
Sierra Mist (discontinued in 2023)
Starry

Keurig Dr Pepper

 50/50
 7 Up
 A&W Cream Soda
 A&W Root Beer
 Barrelhead Root Beer
 Cactus Cooler
 Canada Dry
 Canfield's Diet Chocolate Fudge
 Crush
 Dr Pepper
 Floats
 Gini
 Hawaiian Punch
 Hires Root Beer
 IBC Root Beer
 Orangina
 RC Cola
 Diet Rite
 Nehi
 Ricqlès
 Schweppes
 Squirt
 Stewart's Fountain Classics
 Sun Drop
 Sunkist
 Sussex Golden
 Venom Energy
 Vernors
 Wink

Hamoud Boualem 
Hamoud
Orange Blaze
Selecto
Slim (Lemon)
Slim (Orange)
Lim on orange
Lim on lemon and lime
o’ju orange
o’ju cocktail

National Beverage 
 Faygo
 La Croix Sparkling Water
 Shasta

Others 

Ale-8-One
Barr
Bawls
Big Red (soft drink)
Cheerwine
Dr Brown's
Irn-Bru
Jarritos
Jones Soda
Julebrus
Julmust
Kinnie
Lucozade
Monster Energy
Full Throttle
Moxie
Nehi
Orangina
Oronamin C Drink
Pocari Sweat
Rockstar Energy
Sangria Señorial
Sidral Mundet
Sodastream
Sosyo
Tizer

By type

Cola 
Breizh Cola
Coca-Cola
Green Cola
Jolt Cola
Mecca Cola
Pepsi
RC cola
Topsia Cola
Virgin Vanilla Cola

Lemonade 
Bubble up
Corona
Cresta
R. White's (Britvic)
Sprite

Citrus soda 

Britvic
Tango
Kinnie
Quatro
Ramune
Solo (Australia) (lemon flavored)
Solo (Norway) (orange flavored)
Squirt
Tropicana Tw!ster Soda

Mineral water 

 Aquafina
 Bilbor
 Borsec
 Buxton
 Buziaș
 Damavand
 Fiji
 Highland Spring
 Masafi
 Nectar
 Nestle
 Perrier
 Polar Beverages
 Vittel
 Volvic
Volvic Revive
 Voss

Juice (and related) 
Copella
Cottee's
Crusha
Frijj
Izze
J2O
Kool-Aid
Minute Maid
Mott's
Orangina
Pago International
Pet
Robinsons
Suntop
Taste Farm
Yazoo Chill
Yoo-hoo

Other 
Bacon soft drink (various producers)
Bludwine / Budwine
Liptonice

See also 

 List of soft drink flavors
 List of soft drink producers
 List of soft drinks by country

Notes 

Soft drinks
Soft drink products